Charles H "Charlie" Dyke (23 September 1926 – 4 January 2013) was a Welsh professional footballer who played as a midfielder.

Club career
After over five hundred appearances for Barry Town United, Dyke was inducted into the Barry Town Hall of Fame in 2012.

Death
He died on 4 January 2013.

References

1926 births
2013 deaths
Welsh footballers
Association football midfielders
Troedyrhiw F.C. players
Chelsea F.C. players
Barry Town United F.C. players
Haverfordwest County A.F.C. players
Worcester City F.C. players